Joachim Persson (born 23 May 1983) is a badminton player from Denmark.

Career 
Persson was born in Denmark but his family moved to Germany in his early years. He began to playing badminton in Trittau, Germany together with his parents. As German player, he helped the German team to win the mixed team title at the 2001 European Junior Championships, also won a silver medal in the singles event. In 2002, he moved back to Denmark and started to practice at Brøndby.

He played the 2006 IBF World Championships in men's singles and he was defeated in the third round by Lee Chong Wei 21–16, 21–12. Joachim Persson reached the finals of the Denmark Open Super Series 2008 and lost in the finals to compatriot Peter Gade.

In 2004 he won the Irish International, in 2005 the Finnish International Championships and the V Italian International, and in 2006 the Austrian International, the Swedish International and the Finnish International Championships.

In 2019, he banned from badminton tournaments for 18 months and has been ordered to pay costs of US$4,500, guilty of four violations of the code of conduct in relation to betting wagering and irregular match results.

Achievements

European Championships 
Men's singles

European Junior Championships 
Boys' singles

BWF Superseries (2 runners-up) 
The BWF Superseries, launched on 14 December 2006 and implemented in 2007, was a series of elite badminton tournaments, sanctioned by the Badminton World Federation (BWF). BWF Superseries had two levels: Superseries and Superseries Premier. A season of Superseries features twelve tournaments around the world, introduced in 2007, with successful players invited to the BWF Superseries Finals held at the year's end.

Men's singles

 Superseries tournament
 Superseries Premier tournament
 Superseries Finals tournament

BWF Grand Prix (1 title) 
The BWF Grand Prix has two levels, the BWF Grand Prix and Grand Prix Gold. It is a series of badminton tournaments sanctioned by the Badminton World Federation (BWF) since 2007.

Men's singles

 BWF Grand Prix tournament
 BWF Grand Prix Gold tournament

BWF International Challenge/Series (9 titles, 7 runners-up) 
Men's singles

 BWF International Challenge tournament
 BWF International Series tournament

Record Against Selected Opponents 
Includes results from all competitions 2002–present.

  Chen Yu 0–4
  Bao Chun Lai 0–4
  Xia Xuan Ze 0–1
  Lin Dan 0–5
  Du Peng Yu 2–1
  Chen Jin 0–1
  Chou Tien-chen 0–2
  Hsieh Yu-hsing 1–0
  Petr Koukal 5–2
  Kenneth Jonassen 0–4
  Peter Gade 1–2
  Jan Ø. Jørgensen 2–2
  Marc Zwiebler 2–3
  Taufik Hidayat 1–4
  Sony Dwi Kuncoro 1–2
  Simon Santoso 1–0
  Tommy Sugiarto 1–1
  Sho Sasaki 4–0
  Kenichi Tago 0–2
  Park Sung-hwan 0–1
  Shon Seung-mo 1–1
  Lee Hyun-il 0–5
  Shon Wan-ho 0–2
  Lee Chong Wei 0–5
  Przemyslaw Wacha 7–1
  Boonsak Ponsana 0–2
  Nguyen Tien Minh 0–2

References

External links 
 Joachim Persson official website
 BWF Profile
 Joachim Persson's Profile - Badminton.dk

1983 births
Living people
People from Slagelse
Danish emigrants to Germany
German male badminton players
Danish male badminton players
Sportspeople from Region Zealand